Edward John "Teddy" Ouimet (born July 6, 1947) is a Canadian retired  professional ice hockey goaltender who played in one National Hockey League game for the St. Louis Blues during the 1968–69 NHL season.

Ouimet was a fine junior and minor pro player during a career that lasted over a decade.

Born in the Quebec mining town of Rouyn-Noranda, Ouimet played three years with the Montreal Junior Canadiens, where he led the Ontario Hockey League in shutouts (3) and GAA (2,75) before joining the London Nationals in 1967-68. In June, 1968 he was traded to the St. Louis Blues in a cash deal by the Montreal Canadiens, who had a surplus of talented netminders in their system at the time.

Ouimet played one game for the Blues during his rookie season in the pros but spent most of his time with Kansas City of the Central Hockey League (1963–1984). He continued to toil in the minors until 1975 and also played one game for the New England Whalers of the World Hockey Association. Before retiring after the 1974-75 season, Ouimet's best year was in 1973-74 when he recorded a 2.97 goals against average for the Syracuse Blazers and was named to the North American league First All-Star Team.

Ted has three sons: Terry Ouimet, Mark Ouimet and Jesse Ouimet.

See also
List of players who played only one game in the NHL

External links

1947 births
Canadian ice hockey goaltenders
Cleveland Barons (1937–1973) players
Sportspeople from Rouyn-Noranda
Kansas City Blues players
Living people
London Nationals players
Montreal Junior Canadiens players
New England Whalers players
Port Huron Flags players
Port Huron Wings players
St. Louis Blues players
San Diego Gulls (WHL) players
Syracuse Blazers players
Ice hockey people from Quebec